Farm is the ninth studio album by American alternative rock band Dinosaur Jr. It is the band's first release on the record label Jagjaguwar.

The first editions of the album came with a free white-vinyl 7 inch with the songs "I Don't Wanna Go There" and "Tarpit", recorded live for Pitchfork TV.

The original European version had a mastering error – the volume was 3 dB too loud. The European label PIAS Recordings recalled the affected copies to exchange them with correct ones.

The band released a video for "Over It," directed by Mark Locke. It featured the band members riding around an urban setting on BMX bikes and a skateboard, performing stunts and pratfalls; professional riders were used as stunt doubles. It featured a brief cameo from Mike Watt.

Farm debuted at No. 29 on the Billboard 200, making it the band's highest-charting album in the US. It has gone on to sell over 51,000 copies in US. In 2012 it was awarded a double silver certification from the Independent Music Companies Association, which indicated sales of at least 40,000 copies throughout Europe.

Reception

On Metacritic, Farm received a score of 76 out of 100, indicating "generally favorable reviews" based on 26 reviews.

Track listing

Personnel
Dinosaur Jr.
J Mascis – lead vocals, guitars, producer, writer (1–4, 6–11, 15–16)
Lou Barlow – bass, vocals, lead vocals (tracks 5, 12)
Murph – drums, percussion
Technical
Justin Pizzoferrato – sound engineer
John Agnello – sound engineer, mixing
Greg Calbi – mastering
Marq Spusta – artwork
Russell Warby – booking 
Steve Kaul – booking 
Daniel Murphy – graphic design
Mike McKoy – layout
Brian Schwartz – management
 Recorded at Bisquiteen
 Mastered at Sterling Sound
 Mixed at Bisquiteen

References

External links
New Dinosaur Jr. LP Details Announced at Pitchfork Media
The New Dinosaur Jr. Cover Will Get You High at Pitchfork Media

2009 albums
Dinosaur Jr. albums